The Master of Crossbowmen or more precisely, Master of Arbalesters or Master of Archers was the title of a commander of the Infantry of the French army (the "host") in the Middle Ages and the Renaissance.  The position was an honorific title, not a military rank, created by Louis IX.  The position existed until the reign of François I, when its duties were transferred to the Grand Master of Artillery.

The Master of the Crossbowmen commanded all archers (longbow, arbalest, crossbow, etc.), engineers and workers on siege engines, sappers ("sapeurs") and miners for mining fortifications during siege warfare.  He was under the command of the Constable of France and the Marshals.  Under his command was the Master of Artillery, who would come to more prominence in the reign of Louis XI, with the increased use of artillery.

The office is often considered one of the Great Officers of the Crown of France.

References
This article is based in part on the article Maître des Arbalétriers from the French Wikipedia, retrieved on September 6, 2006.
Nicolle, David. French Armies of the Hundred Years War. London: Osprey Publishing, 2000. 
Nicolle, David. French Medieval Armies 1000-1300. London: Osprey Publishing, 1991. 
Nicolle, David. Medieval Warfare Source Book: Warfare in Western Christendom. London: Brockhampton Press, 1999.

See also
 Great Officers of the Crown of France
 Maison du Roi
 Medieval warfare

Court titles in the Ancien Régime
Military history of the Ancien Régime